Christian Onalfo (born July 26, 1997) is an American soccer player. He is the son of current New England Revolution technical director Curt Onalfo.

Career

Youth
Spent 6 years in the Development Academy for LA Galaxy. From there, went on to win the 2016 USDA National Championship with U-16 LA Galaxy Academy.

Professional
After spending his youth career with the LA Galaxy Academy, Onalfo made his professional debut on July 11, 2015 for USL affiliate club LA Galaxy II in a 4–0 victory over Sacramento Republic FC.

Onalfo, went on to play for Celaya and Celaya Premier down in Liga Ascenso and Liga Premier in Celaya, Mexico. Debuting against Deportivo CAFESSA on September 29, 2018.

Christian Onalfo currently works as a sports agent with Rabona Sports.

International
On July 28, 2015, Onalfo was called up to the U.S. under-20 national team for the Stevan Vilotic-Cele Tournament in Serbia.

References

External links
U.S. Soccer bio
USSF Development Academy bio

1997 births
Living people
American soccer players
LA Galaxy II players
Association football defenders
Soccer players from California
USL Championship players
United States men's under-20 international soccer players
San Diego State Aztecs men's soccer players
Cal State Northridge Matadors men's soccer players
American expatriate soccer players
Expatriate footballers in Mexico
American expatriate sportspeople in Mexico
Sportspeople from Manhattan Beach, California
Celaya F.C. Premier players